Historically, women in Myanmar (also known as Burma) have had a unique social status and esteemed women in Burmese society. According to the research done by Mya Sein, Burmese women "for centuries – even before recorded history" owned a "high measure of independence" and had retained their "legal and economic rights" despite the influences of Buddhism and Hinduism. Burma once had a matriarchal system that includes the exclusive right to inherit oil wells and the right to inherit the position as village head. Burmese women were also appointed to high offices by Burmese kings, can become chieftainesses and queens.

Traditional dress
The htamein is one of the traditional dresses of Burmese women. This skirtcloth or lower body wrapper was worn by women during the Konbaung Dynasty (1752–1855) as a wrap-around skirt, or sometimes as a folded clothing material placed "tightly across the abdomen slightly left center of the waist". In comparison, Burmese men wore the traditional lower garment known as the pahso.

Love and marriage

Marriages were previously allowed between Burmese women and male foreigners provided that the divisional courts in Burma were informed within 21 days of advance notice. However, in May 2010, the government of Burma disallowed conducting of marriage ceremonies between Burmese women and male foreigners. One of the suggested reasons was to avoid human trafficking. Burmese women became victims of human traffickers and were traded for the sex industry in Pakistan and Thailand.

To some extent, arranged marriages was also a part of Burmese tradition, however, the Burmese women have the right to refuse the offer of being betrothed to the parents' chosen partner for her. At present, young Burmese women can choose to marry someone for love.

Women's rights

In 2000, the Asian Women's Resource Exchange (AWORC) published a report entitled Human Rights in Burma from the Forum News (August 1998) describing that by tradition, Burmese women are maternal self-abnegators, meaning that these women "consistently forgo their own needs in order to give their children first priority." The report also indicated that rural and urban Burmese women were affected by the deteriorating economic climate in Burma.

As a result, Burmese families were "increasingly prioritising the rights of males over females to limited resources." These changes affected the access of Burmese women to nutrition, medical services, vocational training, and other educational opportunities. Burmese women became unwilling porters and unpaid labourers for the military, including becoming victims of slavery, murder, torture, rape, and attacks. 

Historically, urban Burmese women "enjoyed high levels of social power" but later became confronted with restrictions on speech and limitations in acquiring high level positions in both private and public offices. According to AWORC, only a few number of Burmese women receive education related to reproductive rights and safe birth control practices, thus making them prone to being infected by HIV and AIDS. The women's rights movement in Burma started with the Burmese Women's Association in 1919.

In January 2008, BBC News featured Burmese Kayan Lahwi women who became tourist attractions in Thailand because of the tradition of wearing coils of brass around their necks. The rings of brass push the "women's shoulders and ribs down" throughout several years giving the effect as if the necks had been stretched, thus described as sporting "unnaturally long, giraffe-like necks."

See also
 Aung San Suu Kyi
 Supayalat, last queen of Burma
 Women's League of Burma
 Myanmar Women's Affairs Federation
 Women's Auxiliary Service (Burma)
 Myanmar women's national football team
 Shan Women's Action Network

References

External links

 Women's League of Burma
 Karen Women Organization
 Burmese women in Thai 'human zoo'
 The war on Burma's women